Revelation 666: the Curse of Damnation is the fourth studio album by Norwegian black metal band Old Man's Child, released on 13 March 2000.

Track listing 
All music and arrangements by Galder. Lyrics by Old Man's Child.
 "Phantoms of Mortem Tales" – 5:35
 "Hominis Nocturna" – 5:22
 "In Black Endless Void" – 4:27
 "Unholy Vivid Innocence" – 5:06
 "Passage to Pandemonium" – 4:13
 "Obscure Divine Manifestation" – 4:20
 "World Expiration" – 6:06
 "Into Silence Embrace" – 5:02

Credits 
 Galder – vocals, guitar, and synths
 Jardar – guitars
 Memnoch – bass
 Tjodalv – drums on tracks 2, 3, 5 and 7
 Grimar – drums on track 1, 4, 6 and 8
 Marielle Andersen – additional vocals on track 4

Additional personnel
 Christophe Szpajdel — logo

References

Old Man's Child albums
2000 albums
Century Media Records albums
Albums produced by Peter Tägtgren